Lakeside Village is an unincorporated community in Bosque County, in the U.S. state of Texas. According to the Handbook of Texas, the community had a population of 226 in 2000.

History
Lakeside Village's location at the upstream end of Lake Whitney makes it known as a fisherman's paradise. It first gained recognition in the 1960s. A dam was built in the area in the late 1940s and early 1950s. It grew up around Morgan Lakeside Park in 1951 and had a marina, a snack bar, a boat ramp, docks, and a barge. The community's businesses included two convenience stores, a cafe, a community center, a volunteer fire department, and a Moose lodge. The stores sold bait and fishing tackle. Residents were also exposed to an RV park, a mobile home park, and lakeside cabins. Locals vote in Precinct 3, which was once a Democratic stronghold, but is now a Republican stronghold. Its population was 375 in 1968, which dropped to 226 from 1990 through 2000.

Geography

Education
Lakeside Village is served by the Kopperl Independent School District.

References

Unincorporated communities in Bosque County, Texas
Unincorporated communities in Texas